The Caledon Golden Hawks are a Canadian junior ice hockey team based in Caledon, Ontario, Canada. They are a member of the Provincial Junior Hockey League. Formerly they played in the Georgian Mid-Ontario Junior C Hockey League.

History
The Caledon Golden Hawks were founded in 2010 as members of the Georgian Mid-Ontario Junior C Hockey League.  The Golden Hawks are the first junior team in Caledon since the Caledon Canadians of the Metro Junior A Hockey League and Ontario Provincial Junior A Hockey League left due to a disagreement with the city in 1999. In their first season in the GBMOJHL, the Golden Hawks leading scorer was Domenic Calabrigo with 48 points, along with 114 PIMs in 40 games.

Season-by-season standings

References

External links
Golden Hawks webpage

Ice hockey teams in Ontario
2010 establishments in Ontario